The PZL Rzeszów  SO-1 and PZL Rzeszów SO-3 are Polish turbojet engines designed by the Instytut Lotnictwa (Institute of Aeronautics ) and manufactured by WSK PZL Rzeszów, to power the PZL TS-11 Iskra jet trainer.  Thirty SO-1s were built, this being superseded by the improved SO-3, of which a further 580 were built.
The engine has a seven-stage compressor, annular combustion chambers, and a single-stage turbine.

Variants
SO-1
Original production. Overhaul life 200 hours. 
SO-3
Improved version of SO-3, intended for tropical use. Modified compressor, combustion chamber and turbine. Overhaul life 400 hours.
SO-3W22
Modified version for PZL I-22 Iryda, 10.79 kN (2,425 lbf) rating, renamed PZL-5.

Applications
 PZL TS-11 Iskra
 PZL I-22 Iryda

Specifications (SO-3)

See also

References

 Lambert, Mark. Jane's All The World's Aircraft 1993-94. Coulsdon, Surry, UK:Jane's Data Division, 1993. .
 Taylor, John W. R. Jane's All The World's Aircraft 1988-89. Coulsdon, Surry, UK:Jane's Defence Data, 1988. .
 Taylor, Michael J. H. Brassey's World Aircraft & Systems Directory 1996/97. London:Brassey's, 1996. .

1960s turbojet engines